The women's 1500 metres event  at the 1975 European Athletics Indoor Championships was held on 8 and 9 March in Katowice.

Medalists

Results

Heats
Held on 8 March.First 3 from each heat (Q) and the next 2 fastest (q) qualified for the semifinals.

Final
Held on 9 March.

References

1500 metres at the European Athletics Indoor Championships